The Jackson Commercial District in Jackson, Kentucky is a  historic district which was listed on the National Register of Historic Places in 1986.  The listing included 13 contributing buildings, two non-contributing buildings and two non-contributing sites.

It covers Main Street from Court Street West to Broadway South.  Most of the buildings are two-story brick buildings.  According to its NRHP nomination, "the buildings are Jackson's best examples of the vernacular style of the era. Technology and craftsmanship are apparent in the cast iron storefronts, pressed metal cornices, brick corbelling, and stone work."

It includes:
Hotel Jefferson
Guerrant Memorial Presbyterian Church
Kash Building
more.

References

Historic districts on the National Register of Historic Places in Kentucky
Neoclassical architecture in Kentucky
Gothic Revival architecture in Kentucky
National Register of Historic Places in Breathitt County, Kentucky